Alec Braedon Sundly (born July 8, 1992) is an American soccer player who last played as a midfielder for California United Strikers in the National Independent Soccer Association.

Career
Sundly played four years of college soccer at the University of California between 2010 and 2013. While at college, Sundly also made a single appearance for USL PDL side Orange County Blue Star in 2012.

On January 16, 2014 Sundly was selected 31st in the 2014 MLS SuperDraft by New England Revolution. He signed with the club on February 27, 2014.

References

External links

USSF Development Academy bio

1992 births
Living people
American soccer players
Association football midfielders
California Golden Bears men's soccer players
New England Revolution draft picks
New England Revolution players
Orange County Blue Star players
People from Dana Point, California
Real Monarchs players
Rochester New York FC players
Soccer players from California
Sportspeople from Orange County, California
USL Championship players
USL League Two players
National Independent Soccer Association players
American expatriate soccer players in Germany
American expatriate soccer players
Expatriate footballers in Sweden
American expatriate sportspeople in Sweden
California Golden Bears men's soccer coaches